Fudbalski klub Iskra (English: Football Club Iskra) is a Montenegrin football club based in Danilovgrad. They currently compete in the Montenegrin First League.

History
FK Iskra was founded in 1919, under the name RSK Sloga Danilovgrad. Since 1929, the team played under the name RSK Zmaj, with their first-ever performance in Montenegrin Football Championship on season 1933–34.
After World War II, the team started to play under the name FK Iskra. First significant success, FK Iskra made with promotion to Montenegrin Republic League 1948–49. Another historical success, FK Iskra made in summer 1956. After playoff games against FK Bokelj, the team from Danilovgrad gained their first-ever promotion to the Yugoslav Second League (1956–57), but finished as a last-placed team. Next year, the team was dissolved after the financial troubles, but was refounded in 1959.
On season 1969–70, FK Iskra won the champion title in the Montenegrin Republic League and gained new promotion to Yugoslav Second League. This time, they spent two seasons in the Second League, among some of well-known national sides such as FK Budućnost, FK Sutjeska or NK GOŠK. On 28 November 1971, FK Iskra made a historical win against neighbouring Podgorica's and Montenegrin strongest side FK Budućnost (1-0).
Until the mid 1990s, FK Iskra played only in the third and fourth division, without significant successes. On season 1993–94, FK Iskra made huge successes, with the 'double' on Republic level. The team from Danilovgrad became a champion of the Montenegrin Republic League and, for the first time in history, title of Montenegrin Republic Cup winner. That gained them promotion to the 1994-95 Yugoslav Second League and the very first performance in the Yugoslav Cup. After poor performance, FK Iskra finished 19th in the Second League, so were relegated to the third-tier competition. In the 1994–95 FR Yugoslavia Cup, FK Iskra made surprise in the first leg, with a victory against First league member FK Sloboda (2:0). But, in the Round of 16, FK Iskra were eliminated by Yugoslav title-holder FK Partizan (0-3; 0-10). During the next period, FK Iskra played between Yugoslav Second League and Montenegrin League. In the second tier, the team from Danilovgrad participated in season 1996–97, and from 2000 to 2003.
Following Montenegrin independence (2006), FK Iskra played in Second and Third League, but first notable successes came after 2013. On season 2013–14, FK Iskra won the champion title in the Third League. Next year, after the hard struggle with FK Dečić, FK Iskra became the champion of the Second League. With that result, FK Iskra gained their historical, first-ever promotion to the Montenegrin First League.
On their debut in the First League (season 2015-16), FK Iskra finished at 10th position, but remained a member of top-tier after the playoffs against FK Bratstvo (6-0; 2-2).
Next three seasons, FK Iskra finished in the middle of the table and notable success came on season 2019-20. Team from Danilovgrad finished third and gained their first-ever performances in European competitions. During the season, FK Iskra made numerous impressive results, including the big victory against title-holder FK Budućnost (4-1). After that success, the team qualified for 2020–21 UEFA Europa League.

First League Record

For the first time, FK Iskra played in Montenegrin First League on season 2015–16. Below is a list of FK Iskra scores in First League by every single season.

Honours
 Montenegrin Second League
Winners: 2014–15
Montenegrin Third League
Winners: 2006–07, 2009–10, 2013–14
 Montenegrin Republic League
Winners: 1969–70, 1972–73, 1993–94, 1999–2000
Runner-up: 1955–56, 1959–60, 1978–79
 Montenegrin Republic Cup
Winners: 1993–94

European record

As of 14 July 2022

Notes
 PR: Preliminary round
 Q1: First qualifying round

Players

Current squad
As of 1 November 2022

Notable players
''For the list of former and current players with Wikipedia article, please see :Category:FK Iskra Danilovgrad players.

Historical list of coaches

 Željko Tomašević (Jul 2008 - Jun 2013)
 Dejan Mrvaljević (2014 - Jul 2015)
 Goran Jovanović (Jul 2015 - Dec 2015)
 Ratko Stevović (1 Jan 2016 - May 2016)
 Milija Savović (Jun 2016)
 Radislav Dragićević (1 Jul 2016 - Dec 2016)
 Mirsad Omerhodžić (28 Dec 2016 - May 2017)
 Jovan Stanković (25 Jun 2017 - Dec 2017)
 Aleksandar Nedović (7 Dec 2017 - 5 May 2021)
 Srđan Nikić (15 May 2021 - 10 Mar 2022)

Stadium

FK Iskra plays its home games at Braća Velašević Stadium. The pitch is built on the Zeta riverbank, at the centre of town. After the last reconstruction, the capacity of stadium is 2,500 seats and in 2019 floodlights were installed.

See also
 Braća Velašević Stadium
 Montenegrin First League
 Football in Montenegro
 Montenegrin clubs in Yugoslav football competitions (1946–2006)
 Danilovgrad

References

External links
FK Iskra Danilovgrad profile  at the Football Association of Montenegro website
Profile by Soccerway 

Association football clubs established in 1919
Football clubs in Montenegro
1919 establishments in Montenegro
Danilovgrad